John Bateman (born 30 September 1993) is an English professional rugby league footballer who plays  for the Wests Tigers in the National Rugby League, and England and Great Britain at international level.

He previously played for the Bradford Bulls and Wigan in the Super League and for the Canberra Raiders in the NRL.

Background
Bateman was born in Bradford, West Yorkshire, England. He is a product of the Bradford Dudley Hill amateur Rugby League club.

Playing career

Bradford

2011 season
In May 2011, he made his first Challenge Cup appearance for the club against Halifax. He made two more first team appearances towards the end of the season, and scored his first Super League try against Wigan Warriors.

2012 season
Bateman featured in Round 1 (Catalans Dragons). He missed Rounds 2–3 due to injury. He featured in six consecutive games from Round 4 (Wakefield Trinity) to Round 9 (Hull F.C.). Bateman was suspended for Round 10 and 11. John returned in Round 12 (Huddersfield Giants). Bateman was suspended for Rounds 13–14. He returned to play in six consecutive games from Round 15 (Leeds Rhinos) to Round 20 (London Broncos). Bateman missed Rounds 21–24 due to England Academy commitments. Bateman returned for Round 25 (Huddersfield Giants). John was injured for Rounds 26–27. He featured in the Challenge Cup against Doncaster and Warrington Wolves. Bateman scored against Hull F.C. (1 try), Doncaster (1 try) and Castleford Tigers (1 try).

In 2012 Bateman was awarded the Albert Goldthorpe Rookie of the Year Medal.

2013 season
In the off-season Bateman signed a 3 Year Extension on his current deal and this will keep him at Odsal until 2015.

He missed Rounds 1–6 due to an injury. He featured in four consecutive games from Round 7 (Hull Kingston Rovers) to Round 10 (Salford City Reds). John missed Round 11–12 due to an injury. He featured in Round 13 (Warrington Wolves) but was subject to a groin injury keeping him out of Round 14. John returned for Round 15 (Salford City Reds) but missed Round 16 but returned in Round 17 (Hull Kingston Rovers) to Round 22 (Hull F.C.). John missed the rest of the season due to surgery on his ankle. Bateman featured in the Challenge Cup against Rochdale Hornets and London Broncos. John scored against Hull Kingston Rovers (1 try), Catalans Dragons (1 try) Salford City Reds (1 try), Rochdale Hornets (1 try) and Wigan Warriors (1 try).

Wigan
In November 2013, Bateman signed a three-year contract with Wigan Warriors for an undisclosed fee, believed to be around £70,000.

2014
Bateman featured in the World Club Challenge against Sydney Roosters. He featured in Round 2 (Castleford Tigers) to Round 15 (Huddersfield Giants) then in Round 18 (St. Helens) to Round 23 (Salford City Reds). John next played in Round 25 (Widnes Vikings) to Round 27 (Warrington Wolves). Bateman played in Round 5 (Hunslet) to the Quarter Final (Castleford Tigers) in the Challenge Cup. John played in the Qualifying Playoff (Huddersfield Giants). He scored against Wakefield Trinity (1 try), the Bradford Bulls (1 try), Salford City Reds (1 try) and London Broncos (1 try).

2015
Bateman played in the World Club Series against Brisbane Broncos. 

Bateman featured in Round 1 (Widnes Vikings) to Round 9 (Salford City Reds) then in Round 11 (Warrington Wolves) to Round 19 (Salford City Reds). He also played in Round 21 (Leeds Rhinos) to Super Eight 6 (St. Helens) then in the Semi Final (Huddersfield Giants) to the Grand Final (Leeds Rhinos). Bateman played in the Challenge Cup in Round 6 (Hull Kingston Rovers). He scored against Huddersfield Giants (4 tries), Hull F.C. (2 tries), Leeds Rhinos (1 try) and Warrington Wolves (2 tries).

He played in the 2015 Super League Grand Final defeat by the Leeds Rhinos at Old Trafford.

2016
Bateman featured in Round 1 (Catalans Dragons) to Round 8 (Hull Kingston Rovers) then in Round 11 (Castleford Tigers) to Round 12 (Huddersfield Giants). He featured in the World Club Series against Brisbane Broncos. He scored against Hull F.C. (1 try), Leeds Rhinos (1 try), Castleford Tigers (2 tries) and Huddersfield Giants (1 try). On 31 May 2016, Wigan confirmed they were investigating an "alleged fracas" between two Wigan players which took place outside of a gym on 27 May, and speculation grew that Bateman was linked to the controversy following his omission from the squad against Salford City Reds and Hull Kingston Rovers. On 15 June 2016, Bateman was fined £10,000 and suspended for eight weeks for his involvement in the incident.

He played in the 2016 Super League Grand Final victory over the Warrington Wolves at Old Trafford.

2017
He played in the 2017 Challenge Cup Final defeat by Hull F.C. at Wembley Stadium.

2018

He played in the 2018 Super League Grand Final victory over the Warrington Wolves at Old Trafford.

Canberra

2019
Bateman signed with the Canberra Raiders for 2019 and 2020, with a third year option in his favour, on 8 August 2018. In round 19 of the 2019 NRL season against the Penrith Panthers, Bateman scored a try in the dying minutes to seal a 30-18 victory for the visitors away from home. The win cemented the Canberra's position in the top 4 of the competition.

At the end of the 2019 regular season, Canberra finished 4th on the table and qualified for the finals.  In the qualifying final against Melbourne, Bateman scored the winning try with just 3 minutes remaining as Canberra staged an upset victory at AAMI Park winning 12-10 and secured a home preliminary final.  In the preliminary final against South Sydney, Bateman played at second-row as Canberra won the match 16-10 at Canberra Stadium and qualified for their first grand final in 25 years. On 2 October, Bateman was named as the 2019 Dally M second-rower of the year at the Dally M Awards ceremony.

2020
In February, it was revealed that Bateman would miss the first six weeks of the 2020 NRL season after undergoing shoulder surgery.
On 31 June, it was announced that he would be departing the Canberra Raiders at the end of the season, With NRL Club, the Canterbury-Bankstown Bulldogs And His former side, The Wigan Warriors interested in his services.

Bateman played a total of 11 games for Canberra in the 2020 NRL season. He featured in all three of Canberra's finals matches including the preliminary final loss to Melbourne.  After the game had concluded, a visibly emotional Bateman thanked everyone at Canberra and stated it would be hard to leave the club.

2021 
In August 2021, it was revealed that Bateman had been involved in a fist fight with then Canberra player Curtis Scott.  The incident was not reported to
the police and the matter was sorted behind closed doors but the story came to light after Scott's termination by the Canberra club.

Re-Joining Wigan
In July 2020, it was announced that Bateman would re-join Wigan for the 2021 season.

2021 
In round 20 of the 2021 Super League season, Bateman was sent to the sin bin twice in Wigan's 26-2 loss against St Helens.

2022 
In the 2022 semi-final, Bateman was sent off for a dangerous high tackle on former teammate Aiden Sezer during the clubs shock defeat to Leeds.

Wests Tigers 
On 26 December, Bateman will leave Wigan to sign on a four-year deal with the NRL club Wests Tigers for 2023.
In round 3 of the 2023 NRL season, Bateman made his long awaited club debut for the Wests Tigers in their 26-22 loss against Canterbury at Belmore Sports Ground.

Statistics

International career
In 2012, Bateman was named captain of the England Academy squad to tour Australia.

Bateman made his England test début against France in October 2015.

After an outstanding Super League 2015 season, Bateman was selected in the senior England team for their test series against New Zealand. Bateman made his début for England in a test match , before the series, against France which saw Bateman score two tries in England's rout of their opponents. For his outstanding efforts in the game, Bateman was awarded man-of-the-match.

In October 2016, Bateman was selected in the England 24-man squad for the 2016 Four Nations.

In October 2017 he was selected in the England squad for the 2017 Rugby League World Cup.

He was selected in squad for the 2019 Great Britain Lions tour of the Southern Hemisphere. He made his Great Britain test debut in the defeat by Tonga.

References

External links

Canberra Raiders profile
Wigan Warriors profile
Statistics at rugby-league.com
Statistics at rlwc2017.com
England profile

1993 births
Living people
Bradford Bulls players
Canberra Raiders players
England national rugby league team captains
England national rugby league team players
English rugby league players
Great Britain national rugby league team players
Rugby league locks
Rugby league players from Bradford
Rugby league second-rows
Wigan Warriors captains
Wigan Warriors players
Wests Tigers players